Witkowski (Polish feminine: Witkowska, plural: Witkowscy) is a Polish surname. It may refer to:

Witkowski
August Witkowski (1854–1913), Polish physicist
Collegium Witkowski in Kraków, Poland
Bronisław Witkowski (1899–1971), Polish luger
Charles S. Witkowski (1907–1993), American politician
Georg Witkowski (1863–1939), Jewish German literary historian
Georges Martin Witkowski (1867–1943), French conductor and composer
Igor Witkowski
John Witkowski (born 1962), American football player
Kalikst Witkowski (1818–1877), Polish politician
Kamil Witkowski (born 1984), Polish footballer
Karol D. Witkowski (1860–1910), Polish-American painter
 (born 1925), German author
Marek Witkowski (born 1974), Polish sprint canoer
Maximilian Harden, born Felix Ernst Witkowski (1861–1927), Jewish German journalist
Michał Witkowski (born 1975), Polish novelist and journalist
 (born 1949), French physicist
Nik Witkowski (born 1976), Canadian rugby player
Norbert Witkowski (born 1981), Polish footballer
 (born 1949), German doctor
 (born 1974), Polish politician
Stanisław Witkowski (1893–1957), Polish military officer
Szczepan Witkowski (1898–1937), Polish soldier and skier
Waldemar Witkowski (born 1953), Polish politician
Kornel Witkowski (born 2002), Polish figure skater
Jacques Witkowski (born 1963), French civil servant
Jean Witkowski (1895–1953), French conductor
Luke Witkowski (born 1990), American ice hockey player
Stefan Witkowski (1931–2007), Polish chess player
Tomasz Witkowski (born 1963), Polish psychologist and writer 
Talia Witkowski (born 1979), American psychologist and human rights leader(PsyD.)
Dr. Elan Witkowski (born 1982), American surgeon and researcher (MD)
David Witkowski (born 1956), Israeli doctor, Instrumental Enrichment

Witkowska
 Agata Witkowska (born 1989), Polish volleyball player
 Edyta Witkowska (born 1979), Polish wrestler
 Ewa Witkowska (born 1957), Polish sprinter
 Grażyna Witkowska (born 1952), Polish gymnast
 Kamila Witkowska (born 1991), Polish volleyball player

Other
 Eugen V. Witkowsky (born 1950), Russian writer
 Margarete Wittkowski (1910–1974), German economist and politician
 Vladimir Vitkovsky (1885–1978), White Army general
 Whitey Witt (1895–1988), born Ladislaw Waldemar Wittkowski, American baseball player

See also
 
 

Polish-language surnames